Robert Fleming Rich (June 23, 1883 – April 28, 1968) was a Republican member of the U.S. House of Representatives from Pennsylvania.

Early life and education

Robert F. Rich was born in Woolrich, Pennsylvania.  He attended Dickinson Seminary in Williamsport, PA, and the Williamsport Commercial College.  He graduated from the Mercersburg Academy in 1902 and attended Dickinson College in Carlisle, PA, from 1903 to 1906.

Commercial enterprises

Rich was engaged in the woolen-mills business in 1906.  He was also engaged in banking and became financially interested in various business and manufacturing enterprises. He was a delegate to the Republican National Conventions in 1924, 1952, and 1956.  He was a member of the board of trustees of Dickinson College from 1912 to 1958, of the Lock Haven Teachers College from 1918 to 1928, and of the Lock Haven Hospital from 1920 to 1951. He was an important supporter of Lycoming College and a member of its board of trustees from 1931 to 1963.

United States House of Representatives

Rich was against allying the USA with the USSR, saying that it would akin to 'get in bed with a rattlesnake and a skunk'.

Rich was elected as a Republican to the 71st Congress to fill the vacancy caused by the death of Edgar R. Kiess.  He was reelected to the 72nd Congress and to the five succeeding Congresses.  He did not seek renomination in 1942.  He was again elected to the Seventy-ninth, Eightieth, and Eighty-first Congresses.   He was not a candidate for renomination in 1950. According to Christopher Manion, Rich:

Woolrich Woolen Mills

He served as general manager of the Woolrich Woolen Mills from 1930 to 1959, president from 1959 to 1964, and chairman of the board from 1964 until 1966 when he became honorary chairman.  He died at Jersey Shore, Pennsylvania, and is interred in Woolrich Cemetery.

References

Sources

The Political Graveyard

External links
 

1883 births
1968 deaths
Politicians from Williamsport, Pennsylvania
Republican Party members of the United States House of Representatives from Pennsylvania
Old Right (United States)
20th-century American politicians